Cartmell is a surname. Notable people with the surname include:

Fraser Cartmell (born 1982), Scottish triathlete
Jack Cartmell (1890-1979), English footballer and trainer
Harry Cartmell (1857–1923), English memoirist
Martha Cartmell (1846–1945), Canadian Methodist/United Church missionary and educator in Japan
Nathaniel Cartmell (1883–1967), American athlete
Tim Cartmell (21st century), American martial artist

See also
Cartmel (disambiguation)